Georg Christoph Eimmart the Younger (22 August 1638 Regensburg – 5 January 1705 Nürnberg), a German draughtsman and engraver, was born at Ratisbon. He was instructed by his father, Georg Christoph Eimart the Elder (1603-1658), who was also an engraver, a painter of portraits, landscapes, still-life, and historical subjects.  He studied at the University of Jena from 1654 to 1658.  Eimmart the Younger resided at Nuremberg, where he died in 1705. He engraved some plates for Sandrart's Academia, and some small etchings of ruins, buildings, and vases, ornamented with figures, which have considerable merit. He was also a mathematician and astronomer, and published in 1701 Iconographia nova contemplationum de Sole.

His mother was Christine Banns (?-1654), daughter of an Austrian tool manager, Damian Banns. On 20 April 1668 he married Maria Walther, daughter of the weighmaster, Christian Walther. His daughter Maria Clara Eimmart (1676–1707) was a designer and engraver as well. She usually worked with her father. She married the astronomer, J. H. Müller, and died at Altdorf in 1707.

He established the first astronomical observatory in Nuremberg. The lunar crater Eimmart is named after Georg Christoph Eimmart the Younger.

References

Attribution:

External links
 
 

1638 births
1705 deaths
German draughtsmen
German engravers
17th-century German mathematicians
Members of the French Academy of Sciences
17th-century German astronomers
People from Regensburg
17th-century German writers
17th-century German male writers
18th-century German writers
18th-century German male writers
18th-century German mathematicians